Grand Hyatt Beijing (S: 北京东方君悦大酒店, T: 北京東方君悅大酒店, P: Běijīng Dōngfāng Jūnyuè Dàjiǔdiàn) is an 825-room luxury hotel Beijing, China that opened in 2001. It is located at the crossroads of Chang'an Avenue and Wangfujing, and is part of the Oriental Plaza – China’s largest commercial complex. 
There are a total of seven food and beverage outlets, including the 'Made in China', 'Noble Court', 'Grand Cafe', 'Da Giorgio' and 'Redmoon'.  

'Made in China' and 'Red Moon' both feature sound systems by prestigious British sound designer 'Mel "Herbie" Kent'.
The indoor swimming pool, which is designed as resort-style, with a virtual sky is one of the indoor swimming pools in the city. It is part of the 'Club Oasis' situated at level P3 in the hotel. There is also a 24-hour fitness centre on the same floor.

It is operated by the Hyatt Hotels Corporation, based in Chicago, the United States.

See also

 List of hotels in Beijing

Footnotes

External links
hotel's official website

Hotels in Beijing
Hyatt Hotels and Resorts
Hotel buildings completed in 2001
Hotels established in 2001
Dongcheng District, Beijing
2001 establishments in China